Maricarmenia is a genus of very small sea snails, marine gastropod mollusk in the family Pyramidellidae, the pyrams and their allies.

Species
Species within the genus Maricarmenia include:
 Maricarmenia accresta Peñas & Rolán, 2017 (length 1.9 mm)

Distribution
This marine species occurs off the Fiji Islands.

References

 Peñas A. & Rolán E. (2017). Deep water Pyramidelloidea from the central and South Pacific. The tribe Chrysallidini. ECIMAT (Estación de Ciencias Mariñas de Toralla), Universidade de Vigo. 412 pp

Pyramidellidae